The R736 road is a regional road in County Wexford, Ireland. It links several villages including Rosslare Strand, Bridgetown, Duncormick, Wellingtonbridge and Newbawn with the N25 primary road.

See also 
 Roads in Ireland
 National primary road

References 

Regional roads in the Republic of Ireland
Roads in County Wexford